Brian Hutton may refer to:

Brian G. Hutton (1935–2014), American actor and director
Brian Hutton, Baron Hutton (1932–2020), Northern Irish judge and peer